Books For Africa is a 501(c)(3) nonprofit organization dedicated to collecting, sorting, shipping, and distributing books to children and adults in Africa. With headquarters in St. Paul, Minnesota, USA, and warehouses in St. Paul and Marietta, Georgia, BFA's mission is to end the book famine in Africa. Books For Africa is the largest shipper of donated text and library books to the African continent, shipping over 50 million books and serving all countries in Africa since 1988.  In fiscal year 2020 alone, BFA shipped 3.7 million books valued at over $38 million, 167 computers and e-readers containing nearly 300,000 digital books, and 6 law and human rights libraries to 20 African countries. More than $3.2 million was raised in the same year to ship these books to the students of Africa

Books For Africa has received nine consecutive 4-star ratings from Charity Navigator, as well as a 100% rating in accountability and transparency. It meets all standards set by the Charities Review Council. 

In order to cover shipping costs ($11,000 to ship a 40-foot container with approximately 22,000 books to an African seaport), Books For Africa relies on donations and partners with Better World Books, a social venture company that runs book drives to raise funding for literacy-based nonprofits. Better World Books is their largest single source of funding and their largest source of post-secondary books.

Notes and references

External links
 
BFA's relationship with Better World Books
Charity Navigator's page about BFA

Book promotion
Organizations promoting literacy
Non-profit organizations based in Minnesota
African culture in the United States